Kendriya Vidyalaya, Hisar is a govt school located in Hisar Military Station at Hisar in the Indian state of Haryana.

Details
The school has 38 classrooms, 10 labs, 1 library and other facilities

Academics
The schools offer classes till and also classes 1st10+2.

See also 
 List of Universities and Colleges in Hisar
 List of schools in Hisar
 List of institutions of higher education in Haryana

References

External links 
 

High schools and secondary schools in Haryana
Kendriya Vidyalayas
Boys' schools in India
Hisar district